Nancy Ellen Friedman Atlas (born May 20, 1949) is a former United States district judge of the United States District Court for the Southern District of Texas.

Early life and education
Born in New York City, Atlas received a Bachelor of Science degree from Tufts University in 1971 and a Juris Doctor from New York University School of Law in 1974. She was a law clerk to Judge Dudley Bonsal of the United States District Court for the Southern District of New York from 1974 to 1976.

Career
After working in private practice in New York City from 1976 to 1978 as an associate at the law firm Webster & Sheffield, Atlas was an Assistant United States Attorney for the Southern District of New York from 1979 to 1982. She was thereafter in private practice in Houston, Texas, until 1995.

Federal judicial service
On April 4, 1995, Atlas was nominated by President Bill Clinton to a seat on the United States District Court for the Southern District of Texas vacated by James DeAnda. She was confirmed by the United States Senate on June 30, 1995, and received her commission the same day. She assumed senior status on June 20, 2014. She retired from the court on July 31, 2022.

See also
 List of Jewish American jurists

References

External links
 

1949 births
Living people
20th-century American judges
20th-century American women judges
21st-century American judges
21st-century American women judges
Assistant United States Attorneys
Judges of the United States District Court for the Southern District of Texas
Lawyers from New York City
People from Scarsdale, New York
Scarsdale High School alumni
United States district court judges appointed by Bill Clinton